Uraechoides is a genus of longhorn beetles of the subfamily Lamiinae, containing the following species:

 Uraechoides taomeiae Hayashi, Nara & Yu, 1995
 Uraechoides vivesi Breuning, 1981

References

Lamiini